"Don't Worry 'Bout That Mule" is a song attributed to Charles Stewart, William Davis, Duke Groaner, and Fleecie Moore. It was performed by Louis Jordan and his Tympany Five, recorded in July 1945, and released on the Decca label (catalog no. 18734-A). 

It peaked at No. 1 on Billboards race record chart and remained on that chart for 11 weeks. It ranked No. 11 on the magazine's list of the most played race records of 1946.  

Jordan and the Tympany Five also performed the song in two motion pictures: Beware (1946) and Swing Parade of 1946 (1946).

Jordan biographer Stephen Koch noted that the granting of partial songwriting credit to Jordan's wife, Fleecie Moore, was part of "a publishing and tax dodge gone awry."

See also
 Billboard Most-Played Race Records of 1946

References

1946 songs
Louis Jordan songs
Songs about mammals